Tillandsia toropiensis is a species in the genus Tillandsia. This species is native to Brazil.

References

toropiensis
Flora of Brazil